Jałowiec may refer to the following places in Poland:
Jałowiec, Lower Silesian Voivodeship (south-west Poland)
Jałowiec, Pomeranian Voivodeship (north Poland)